Banwari Lal is an Indian politician. He was elected to the Haryana Legislative Assembly from Bawal in the 2019 Haryana Legislative Assembly election as a member of the Bharatiya Janata Party.

References 

Living people
Bharatiya Janata Party politicians from Haryana
People from Rewari district
Haryana MLAs 2019–2024
Year of birth missing (living people)